Lost in Love is a ten-track collection of songs that were recorded by Freda Payne during the decade of the seventies. With the exception of her biggest hit "Band of Gold," the rest of the tracks were recorded after she left the label of Invictus Records in 1973 (Invictus went defunct that same year). Tracks 2 through 9 were all taken from Payne's album Out of Payne Comes Love, while the final selection is from her album Payne & Pleasure, which was released a year before Out of Payne Comes Love.

Track listing

"Band of Gold" courtesy of Holland Group Productions, Inc., by arrangement with Celebrity Licensing, Inc.

Album credits
Compiled by: Bob Zipkin
Project coordination: Jeff Fura and Lynise Levine
Photo courtesy of: Showtime Archives (Toronto)

2000 compilation albums
Freda Payne albums